Walker Creek is a tributary of the Little Kanawha River,  long, in western West Virginia in the United States.

Walker Creek’s course and drainage area are entirely in eastern Wood County.

According to the West Virginia Department of Environmental Protection, approximately 91% of the Walker Creek watershed is forested, mostly deciduous.  Approximately 8% is used for pasture and agriculture.  A portion of the creek’s course near its headwaters was impounded in 1979 for recreational purposes, forming the  Mountwood Park Lake.  Portions of the creek’s lower course are paralleled by the North Bend Rail Trail, a former line of the Baltimore and Ohio Railroad.

According to the Geographic Names Information System, Walker Creek has also been known historically by the name "Walker’s Creek."

See also
List of rivers of West Virginia

References 

Rivers of West Virginia
Little Kanawha River
Rivers of Wood County, West Virginia